William Faris Blakely (November 1875 – 1 September 1941) was an Australian botanist and collector. From 1913 to 1940 he worked in the National Herbarium of New South Wales, working with Joseph Maiden on Eucalyptus, Maiden named a red gum in his honour, Eucalyptus blakelyi. His botanical work centred particularly on Acacias, Loranthaceae and Eucalypts.

The standard author abbreviation Blakely is used to indicate this person as the author when citing a botanical name.

Some published names
(incomplete)
 Acacia abrupta Maiden & Blakely Journal and Proceedings of the Royal Society of Western Australia 1927
 Acacia acellerata Maiden & Blakely Journal and Proceedings of the Royal Society of Western Australia 1927
 Astrotricha crassifolia Blakely -- Proc. Linn. Soc. N. S. W. 1925, 1. 385..
 Olearia stilwellae Blakely—Proc. Linn. Soc. N. S. W. 1925, 1.385. 
 Hibbertia dentata var. calva Blakely—Contr. New South Wales Natl. Herb. 1(3) 1951 
 Brachyloma daphnoides var. glabrum Blakely—Contr. New South Wales Natl. Herb. 1(3) 1951 
 Bertya astrotricha Blakely—Contr. New South Wales Natl. Herb. 1(3) 1951
 Bertya mollissima Blakely—Contr. New South Wales Natl. Herb. 1(3) 1951
 Bertya oblonga BlakelyProc. Linn. Soc. N. S. W. liv. 682 (1929).
 Eucalyptus wandoo Blakely  A Key to the Eucalypts 1934

Publications 
(incomplete)
 Blakely, W.F. 1922. The Loranthaceae of Australia. Part iii. Proceedings of the Linnean Society of New South Wales 47(4)
 Blakely, W.F. 1965. A key to the eucalypts : with descriptions of 522 species and 150 varieties. Trove: summary

References

External links 
http://www.anbg.gov.au/biography/blakely-william.html

20th-century Australian botanists
Australian taxonomists
Botanists with author abbreviations
1875 births
1941 deaths
Botanists active in Australia
Botanical collectors active in Australia